Hossam Hassan is a retired footballer who represented the Egypt national football team and is his country's all-time highest goalscorer with 68 goals. He appeared 176 times for Egypt between 1985 and 2006. He made his debut on 10 September 1985 in a friendly against Norway at the Ullevaal Stadion in Oslo. His first international goal came during the 1988 Arab Nations Cup, scoring the third goal in a 3–0 win over Lebanon on 15 July 1988.

Hassan became his country's top scorer when he scored his 43rd goal against Togo in a friendly in December 1997; at the time the record of 42 was held by Hassan El-Shazly. As of April 2022, Mohamed Salah is the active player closest to Hassan's figure, with 47 goals.

Out of Hassan's 68 goals, 42 were in official matches while 25 came in friendlies. Hassan has scored more goals (six) against Ethiopia and Togo than any other nations. Hassan two hat-trick in his international career, his first coming in a 7–1 victory over Namibia during the 1998 FIFA World Cup qualification and the second in a 4–0 win over Zambia at the 1998 Africa Cup of Nations, where Hassan was also the tournament joint top scorer with seven goals, sharing the honour with Benni McCarthy.

International goals
Scores and results list Egypt's goal tally first.

1 This does not count as an A-international match for FIFA.
2 The 1992 Arab Nations Cup matches are not considered as A-internationals by FIFA as Egypt sent their Olympic team.

Statistics

See also
 List of footballers with 50 or more international goals
 List of top international men's association football goal scorers by country

Notes

References

Egypt national football team
Hassan
Hassan